North Avondale is an unincorporated community in Pueblo County, Colorado, United States.  The U.S. Post Office at Avondale (ZIP Code 81022) now serves North Avondale postal addresses.

Geography 
North Avondale is located at  (38.261637,-104.349003).

References 

Unincorporated communities in Pueblo County, Colorado
Unincorporated communities in Colorado